Tangrian is a village in the Punjab province of Pakistan. It is located at 30°48'10N 74°11'5E with an altitude of 181 metres (597 feet).

References

Villages in Punjab, Pakistan